The men's coxed four competition at the 1960 Summer Olympics took place at Lake Albano, Italy. It was held from 31 August to 3 September. There were 21 boats (105 competitors) from 21 nations, with each nation limited to a single boat in the competition. The event was won by the United Team of Germany in its debut in the event (the rowers were from West Germany; Germany had previously won four times). Silver went to the French crew, the nation's first medal in the event since 1936. The defending champions Italy received bronze this time. In an event which saw constant turnover even from consistently strong nations, three members of the Italian team returned from the 1956 gold-medal crew to earn a second medal this Games: Romano Sgheiz, Ivo Stefanoni, and Franco Trincavelli were only the 2nd, 3rd, and 4th men to earn multiple medals in the coxed four.

Background

This was the 11th appearance of the event. Rowing had been on the programme in 1896 but was cancelled due to bad weather. The coxed four was one of the four initial events introduced in 1900. It was not held in 1904 or 1908, but was held at every Games from 1912 to 1992 when it (along with the men's coxed pair) was replaced with the men's lightweight double sculls and men's lightweight coxless four.

German teams had won the last three European championships since the 1956 Games (East Germany in 1957, West Germany in 1958 and 1959). The Olympic team for the United Team of Germany was a West German crew, including three of the members of the 1959 European champion team; it was heavily favoured. Italy, the reigning champions and 1960 Olympic hosts, returned three members of their crew but had not found success since their victory in Melbourne.

Romania made its debut in the event; East and West Germany competed together as the United Team of Germany for the first time. The United States made its ninth appearance, most among nations to that point.

Competition format

The coxed four event featured five-person boats, with four rowers and a coxswain. It was a sweep rowing event, with the rowers each having one oar (and thus each rowing on one side). The competition used the 2000 metres distance that became standard at the 1912 Olympics and which has been used ever since except at the 1948 Games.

This rowing competition consisted of three main rounds (heats, semifinals, and final), as well as a repechage round that allowed teams that did not win their heats to advance to the semifinals.

 Quarterfinals: Four heats. With 21 boats entered, there were to be five boats per heat except the last heat, which had six. The winner of each heat advanced directly to the semifinals, all other boats went to the repechage.
 Repechage: Four heats. With 17 boats racing in but not winning their initial heats, there were four or five boats per repechage heat. The top two boats in each repechage heat advanced to the semifinals, with the remaining boats eliminated.
 Semifinals: A total of 12 boats reached the semifinals (4 from the heats, 8 from the repechage). They were divided into two semifinals of six boats each. The top three boats in each semifinal advanced to the final, the fourth through sixth place boats were eliminated.
 Final: The final consisted of the remaining six boats.

Schedule

All times are Central European Time (UTC+1)

Results

Quarterfinals

Quarterfinal 1

Quarterfinal 2

Quarterfinal 3

Quarterfinal 4

Repechage

Repechage heat 1

Repechage heat 2

Repechage heat 3

Repechage heat 4

Semifinals

Semifinal 1

Semifinal 2

Final

References

Rowing at the 1960 Summer Olympics